Nanomantinae is a praying mantis subfamily in the new (2019) family Nanomantidae. The monotypic tribe Nanomantini was placed here, but several genera have been reassigned.

Genera
The Mantodea Species File lists:
 Miromantis Giglio-Tos, 1927
 Nanomantis Saussure, 1871
 Ormomantis Giglio-Tos, 1915
 Oxymantis Werner, 1931
 Parananomantis Mukherjee, 1995
 Sceptuchus Hebard, 1920

References

External links

Nanomantidae
Mantodea subfamilies